Beatles Ashram (बीटल्स आश्रम), also known as Chaurasi Kutia (चौरासी कुटिया), is an ashram close to the north Indian city of Rishikesh in the state of Uttarakhand. It is located on the eastern bank of the Ganges river, opposite the Muni Ki Reti area of Rishikesh, in the foothills of the Himalayas. During the 1960s and 1970s, as the International Academy of Meditation, it was the training centre for students of Maharishi Mahesh Yogi, who devised the Transcendental Meditation technique. The ashram gained international attention between February and April 1968 when the English rock band the Beatles studied meditation there, along with celebrities such as Donovan, Mia Farrow and Mike Love. It was the setting for the band's most productive period as songwriters, where they composed most of the songs for their self-titled double album, also known as the "White Album".

The site was abandoned in the 1990s and reverted to the local forestry department in 2003, after which it became a popular visiting place for fans of the Beatles. Although derelict and overrun by jungle, the site was officially opened to the public in December 2015. It is now known as Beatles Ashram and held an exhibition in February 2018 to celebrate the 50th anniversary of the Beatles' arrival in Rishikesh.

Background and location

Maharishi Mahesh Yogi leased the site from the state forestry department of Uttar Pradesh in 1961. It sits on a -high cliff overlooking the Ganges river, on a hill known as Manikoot, and comprises  of land surrounded by jungle. The facility was built in 1963 with a $100,000 gift from American heiress Doris Duke. Referred to locally as the Chaurasi Kutia ashram, and by some meditators as Shankaracharya Nagar, it was named the "International Academy of Meditation" by the Maharishi. It was one of many ashrams in the Rishikesh area, which is a place of religious significance and known as the "yoga capital of the world".

The ashram is located due east of the Muni Ki Reti area of Rishikesh, in the north of the city, and on the opposite bank of the river. Alternatively, a ferry service was available, from close to what is now the Ram Jhula suspension bridge, built in 1986. Before the opening of Ram Jhula, vehicles crossed the Ganges over the narrow bridge at Haridwar, south of Rishikesh, and then travelled 13 miles along a twisty and potholed dirt road to the ashram.

In November 2020, the Janki Setu (or Sita Pul) bridge opened to the public. The 274-metre bridge allows access for two-wheelers and pedestrians, and further reduces the distance to the ashram.

Facilities

The training centre was designed to suit Western habits and was described variously as "luxurious" and "seedy". It was built to accommodate several dozen people and each of its stone bungalows contained five rooms. According to author Susan Shumsky, a TM devotee whose first retreat at the ashram was in 1970, the facility was "under constant construction". In addition to several stone huts, there were accommodation blocks, known as puri, each containing six self-contained rooms. The Maharishi's residence was a long, modern-style bungalow located away from the other buildings. According to journalist Raymond Zhong, who visited the site in 2015, the name Chaurasi Kutia is Hindi for "84 Huts". He also comments on the less traditional design aspects: "One four-story building has a stepped pyramid design and multifoil arches above the doorways, and on the roof there are massive white structures shaped like ostrich eggs ..." Shumsky writes that the Maharishi's bungalow was a "simple brick, concrete, and stone" building, and far from the lavish accommodation commonly depicted in the media in the aftermath to the Beatles' stay at the ashram.

The compound was surrounded by a wire fence, which served as a barrier against the abundant wildlife in the interior. Beyond the fence, the forest was thick with teak, guava and  trees, while inside were gardens filled with flowerbeds of red hibiscus. At the entrance to the site, there was a gatehouse, signposted as the "Inquiry Office", and a white picket fence inside the wire fence. Along the cliff edge, a path led down to the shoreline.

The Maharishi addressed his students in the two-storey lecture hall. This high-ceilinged structure had long windows that, as with its roof, provided a popular habitat for birds and monkeys. The kitchen block was towards the rear of the site. Meals were taken communally in an open dining area, over which stood a wooden trellis.

For the Beatles' stay in early 1968, according to one of the Maharishi's aides at the time, Ravindra Damodara, four small stone-covered buildings were constructed along the path down from the main centre to the ashram gates. These dome-shaped "caves" included a raised platform, accessed by ladder, on which each Beatle could engage in advanced meditation. During the same period, the Maharishi was negotiating with the Indian government to convert some nearby parkland into an airstrip for a Beechcraft aeroplane that he had been given. Several thousand landless peasants objected to this deal, as they had been denied the use of the land for farming.

The Beatles' stay

The Beatles' decision to study Transcendental Meditation in India brought international renown to the ashram and to Rishikesh. The band and their entourage travelled there in two separate groups. George Harrison and John Lennon, together with their respective wives, Pattie Boyd and Cynthia Lennon, and Boyd's sister Jenny, arrived in Delhi on 16 February 1968. Recalling their arrival, Harrison said: "Rishikesh is an incredible place, situated where the Ganges flows out of the Himalayas into the plains between the mountains and Delhi. There is quite a hefty flow of water coming out of the Himalayas, and we had to cross the river by a big swing suspension bridge [the Lakshman Jhula]." The Beatles were followed by a retinue of reporters and photographers, who were mostly kept out of the fenced and gated compound. Scottish singer-songwriter Donovan arrived soon after the Beatles, and Mia Farrow, Mike Love of the Beach Boys and jazz flautist Paul Horn were among the dozens of other meditators, all of them Europeans or Americans. One of the Beatles' friends, Alexis "Magic Alex" Mardas, an electronics engineer and inventor, was summoned to Rishikesh in the hope of providing the ashram with a high-power radio transmitter to broadcast the Maharishi's message.

The bungalows allotted to the Beatles were equipped with electric heaters, running water, toilets, and English-style furniture. According to Nancy Cooke de Herrera, an American devotee who was assigned to look after the Western celebrities, the Maharishi obtained many "special items" from a nearby village so that the Beatles' rooms would have mirrors, wall-to-wall carpeting, wall coverings, foam mattresses and bedspreads. Ringo Starr later compared the ashram to "a kind of spiritual Butlins", a low-cost British holiday camp. The Beatles adopted native dress, and the ashram had a tailor on the premises to make clothes for the students. Members of their party shopped in local towns and bought saris for themselves and material to be made into shirts and jackets for the men. These towns included Dehradun and Mussoorie, where markets were held by Tibetans who had been driven out of their homeland by Chinese encroachment into Tibet.

Having ordered several Indian instruments for delivery from Delhi, Harrison commandeered one of the bungalows for a music room. He invited all the students to participate, and musical get-togethers took place on the roof of the building. The stay at the ashram turned out to be the Beatles' most creative period for songwriting. Many of their new songs were inspired by nature and reflected the simplicity of the surroundings. With Lennon and Paul McCartney especially productive during the retreat, the songs later comprised the bulk of the band's 1968 double album The Beatles, also known as the "White Album". In the 2021 documentary film The Beatles and India, TM devotee Nick Nugent recalls the band performing a rooftop concert at the ashram, anticipating their well-known concert on top of the Apple Corps building in January 1969.

Harrison and Lennon were the most dedicated of the Beatles to meditation, and they were the last members of the band to depart from the ashram. They left on 12 April amid an atmosphere of recrimination towards the Maharishi, based on rumours of his alleged impropriety with some of the female students, and the two band members' misgivings that he was taking advantage of the Beatles' fame. Despite their subsequent repudiation of the Maharishi, the Beatles' stay at the ashram generated wide interest in Transcendental Meditation, which encouraged the study of Eastern spirituality in Western popular culture. Asked if he forgave the Beatles for their slight on his reputation, following Harrison's personal apology in 1991, the Maharishi replied, "I could never be upset with angels."

Abandonment and development proposals

The Maharishi stopped using the ashram during the 1970s. With the lease having expired in 1981, the land was reclaimed by the government in the mid 1990s as part of what is now Rajaji Tiger Reserve. The former ashram then fell into disrepair, as a result of vandalism and the encroachment of the jungle. In 2003, Jerry Hall produced a television series for the BBC titled Gurus, which included interviews with TM initiates such as Cooke de Herrera, and a visit to the ashram in Rishikesh. In 2007, Canadian actress Maggie Blue O'Hara announced plans to renovate and convert the property into a home for the street children of New Delhi.

The future of the site became a topic of political debate at the state and national levels. In 2011, a plan was announced by the state government of Uttarakhand to build an Ayush Gram there. Its potential as a tourist attraction was a popular campaign issue for several candidates during the 2012 Uttarakhand Legislative Assembly election. In the 2009 Indian general election, Satpal Maharaj had raised the importance of retaining "the rich spirituality of the area" and in 2013 he vowed to preserve the "glorious history of the Beatles" represented by Chaurasi Kutia.

Public opening and adoption as Beatles Ashram

From the 1990s, trespassers on the ashram site had taken to leaving graffiti as a tribute to the Beatles. In 2012, street artist Pan Trinity Das founded "The Beatles Cathedral Gallery" with the aim of "re-activating" Satsang Hall, the property's former lecture hall, but his and others' efforts were curtailed by officials from the forestry department.

In early December 2015, the ashram was officially opened to the public, with an entrance fee of 150 rupees for Indian people and 650 rupees for other nationalities. Coinciding with this event, the director of the Rajaji Tiger Reserve stated his intention to preserve the existing buildings as "heritage structures" while Dinesh Agrawal, the foreign minister for Uttarakhand, said: "Our aim is to ensure that visitors don't simply come for the Beatles connection but to learn the magic of nature, meditation and yoga." Aside from viewing the ashram ruins, nature walks and bird-watching tours were available to visitors. Reporting on the opening for The Wall Street Journal, Raymond Zhong described the ashram as "One of the most storied locations in Beatles lore". He said that the Cathedral Gallery was the "main attraction" and a "showcase for some accomplished graphic art".

In February 2016, the Cathedral Gallery initiative was reborn as the Beatles Ashram Mural Project, when four artists, including Das, were invited to produce a series of murals for the hall. Another of the artists, Miles Toland, said he sought to pay tribute to the Maharishi in his work, which depicts spiritually themed scenes he first photographed in Rishikesh.

In February 2018, the 50th anniversary of Lennon and Harrison's arrival in Rishikesh was marked by the opening of a two-year exhibition titled The Beatles in India at the Beatles Story museum in Liverpool. A similar celebration took place at Chaurasi Kutia, now known as Beatles Ashram, further to the announcement of plans for a full renovation of the site and the founding of a museum dedicated to the Beatles and the Maharishi. The exhibition in Liverpool featured memorabilia, photographs from the 1968 retreat by Paul Saltzman, a sitar courtesy of the Ravi Shankar Foundation, and video contributions from Pattie and Jenny Boyd. The 2018 International Yoga Festival, held in Rishikesh from 1 March, dedicated three days of its program to acknowledge the anniversary of the Beatles' visit.

Gallery

Notes

References

Sources

External links
Paul Saltzman's Beatles in India Interview on VVH-TV

Ashrams
The Beatles and India
Transcendental Meditation
Rishikesh